56 Aquarii, abbreviated 56 Aqr, is a star in the constellation of Aquarius. 56 Aquarii is its Flamsteed designation. It is a sixth magnitude star, having an apparent visual magnitude of 6.36, and thus is a challenge to view with the naked eye. At that distance, the visual magnitude is diminished by an extinction of 0.12 due to interstellar dust. The star is moving closer with a heliocentric radial velocity of −28 km/s. It is a candidate runaway star showing a transverse peculiar velocity of 213.87 km/s.

Houk and Smith-Moore (1978) gave this star a stellar classification of B8 II, matching a B-type bright giant. In contrast, Cowley et al. (1969) found a class of B8 Vs, corresponding to a B-type main-sequence star with narrow ("sharp") absorption lines due to a relatively low projected rotation. Zorec and Royer (2012) modeled it as a dwarf star that is 67% of the way through its main sequence lifespan. It is a chemically peculiar mercury-manganese star, showing abnormally strong absorption lines of mercury and magnesium with weak lines of helium. The star has 3.4 times the mass of the Sun and about 2.8 times the Sun's radius. It is radiating 185 times the Sun's luminosity from its photosphere at an effective temperature of 11,912 K.

References

B-type bright giants
B-type main-sequence stars
Mercury-manganese stars
Runaway stars

Aquarius (constellation)
Durchmusterung objects
Aquarii, 056
213236
111086
8567